Sekou, also spelled Sékou or Seku, is a given name from the Fula language. It is equivalent to the Arabic Sheikh. People with this name include:

Given name
 Seku Amadu (1776–1845), also known as Sékou Amadou or Sheikh Amadu, founder of the Massina Empire in Mali 
 Ahmed Sékou Touré (1922–1984), first president of Guinea (1958–1984)
 Sekou Sundiata (1948–2007), African-American poet and performer at The New School in New York City
 Sekou Conneh (born 1960), Liberian politician and former rebel leader
 Sékou Dramé (born 1973), Guinean football player
 Sékou Berthé (born 1977), Malian football defender who last played for Persepolis in Iran Pro League
 Sékou Fofana (born 1980), Malian football defender who plays for FC Banants in Armenian Premier League
 Sékou Tidiane Souaré (born 1983), Ivorian football player, who currently plays for B36 Tórshavn
 Sekou Baradji (born 1984), French football midfielder
 Sékou Camara (footballer, born 1985) (1985–2013), Malian footballer
 Sekou Cissé (born 1985), Côte d'Ivoire football striker
 Sekou Bagayoko (born 1987), Malian professional football player who plays for Jeunesse Sportive de la Saoura
 Sekou Jabateh Oliseh (born 1990), Liberian international footballer who plays professionally for Russian side Kuban Krasnodar
 Sekou Bangoura (born 1991), American tennis player
 Sékou Baradji (born 1995), French football forward
 Sekou Lumumba, Canadian rock musician
 Sekou Odinga, born Nathanial Burns, American activist who was imprisoned for actions with the Black Liberation Army
 Sékou Traoré, filmmaker from Burkina Faso
 Sekou Smith, American sportswriter
 Hakeem Sekou Jeffries, American politician, Representative for New York’s 8th congressional district

Surname
 Lasana M. Sekou (born 1959), writer from Saint Martin
 Malik Sekou (born 1964), academic from the United States Virgin Islands

See also
 Sékou, Benin, a town and arrondissement in the Atlantique Department of southern Benin

African given names